This is a list of music videos directed by Dave Meyers.

Music videos

1997
 E-40 featuring B-Legit and Richie Rich - "Yay Deep"
 Made Men - "You Could Be the One"
 Plexi - "Forest Ranger"
 Twista - "Get It Wet"
 Sons of Funk - "Pushin' Inside You"
 Master P - "Ghetto D"
 Master P - "6 in the Mornin'"
 Kurupt - "It's a Set Up"
 The WhoRidas - "Keep It Goin'"
 Young Bleed featuring Master P and Fiend - "Times So Hard"
 Luke - "Raise the Roof"
 The Notorious B.I.G. - "What's Beef"

1998
 E-40 - "Hope I Don't Go Back"
 Ginuwine featuring Timbaland - "Same Ol' G"
 Ice Cube - "War & Peace"
 Magic featuring C-Murder - "No Hope"
 MC Ren - "Ruthless for Life"
 Silkk the Shocker featuring Destiny's Child - "Just 'B' Straight" (version 2)

1999
 Kid Rock - "Bawitdaba"
 Powerman 5000 - "When Worlds Collide"
 Juvenile - "Back That Thang Up"
 Kid Rock - "Cowboy"
 Def Leppard - "Goodbye"
 Sugar Ray - "Falls Apart"
 Lil Wayne - "Tha Block Is Hot"
 Powerman 5000 - "Nobody's Real"
 Filter - "Take a Picture"
 LL Cool J - "Shut 'Em Down"
 Jay-Z featuring Beanie Sigel - "Do It Again (Put Ya Hands Up)"
 Eve featuring Faith Evans - "Love Is Blind"

2000
 Buckcherry - "Check Your Head"
 Da Brat - "That's What I'm Looking For"
 Pink - "There You Go"
 Tal Bachman - "If You Sleep"
 Static-X - "I'm with Stupid"
 Enrique Iglesias - "Be with You"
 Nas featuring Ginuwine - "You Owe Me"
 Drag-On featuring DMX - "Niggaz Die for Me"
 Hanson - "This Time Around"
 Goodie Mob featuring TLC - "What It Ain't (Ghetto Enuff)"
 Beanie Sigel - "The Truth"
 Da Brat featuring Tyrese - "What'chu Like"
 DMX - "Party Up (Up in Here)"
 Kid Rock - "American Bad Ass"
 Hanson - "If Only"
 Lil' Mo - "Ta Da"
 Eve featuring Jadakiss - "Got It All"
 Jermaine Dupri and Nas featuring Monica - "I've Got to Have It"
 Lil' Bow Wow - "Bounce with Me"
 Creed - "With Arms Wide Open"
 Kottonmouth Kings - "Peace Not Greed"
 Britney Spears - "Lucky"
 Pink - "Most Girls"
 Mack 10 - "From tha Streetz"
 Ja Rule featuring Christina Milian - "Between Me and You"
 VAST - "Free"
 Killing Heidi - "Weir" (USA Version)
 Outkast - "B.O.B."
 Jay-Z - "I Just Wanna Love U (Give It 2 Me)"
 NSYNC - "This I Promise You"
 The Offspring - "Original Prankster"
 Pru - "Candles"
 Lil' Bow Wow featuring Snoop Dogg - "Bow Wow (That's My Name)"
 Chico DeBarge - "Playa Hater"
 Mýa - "Free"
 Mack 10 featuring T-Boz - "Tight to Def"
 Lil Zane - "None Tonight"
 Xzibit - "X"
 Pink - "You Make Me Sick"

2001
 Jay-Z featuring Beanie Sigel & Memphis Bleek - "Change the Game"
 O-Town - "Liquid Dreams"
 Scarface - "Look Me in My Eyes"
 Dido - "Thank You"
 Monica - "Just Another Girl"
 Memphis Bleek - "Do My..."
 Lil' Bow Wow featuring Jagged Edge - "Puppy Love"
 Run-DMC - "Rock Show"
 Dave Matthews Band - "I Did It"
 Outkast - "So Fresh, So Clean"
 Janet Jackson - "All for You"
 Tyrese - "I Like Them Girls"
 Saliva - "Your Disease"
 Missy Elliott - "Get Ur Freak On"
 The Product G&B - "Cluck Cluck"
 Nicole - "I'm Lookin'"
 Usher - "U Remind Me"
 Dave Matthews Band - "The Space Between"
 Snoop Dogg featuring Tyrese - "Just a Baby Boy"
 Sisqó featuring LovHer - "Can I Live?"
 Redman featuring DJ Kool - "Let's Get Dirty (I Can't Get in da Club)"
 Missy Elliott featuring Ludacris and Trina - "One Minute Man"
 Jennifer Lopez - "I'm Real"
 Jagged Edge featuring Nelly - "Where the Party At" (version 1)
 Sisqó - "Dance for Me"
 Brian McKnight - "Love of My Life"
 Redman - "Smash Sumthin'"
 Jennifer Lopez featuring Ja Rule - "I'm Real (Murder Remix)"
 Limp Bizkit - "Boiler"
 Macy Gray - "Sweet Baby"
 Mary J. Blige - "Family Affair"
 Slipknot - "Left Behind"
 Jay-Z - "Izzo (H.O.V.A.)"
 Ja Rule featuring Case - "Livin' It Up"
 Jermaine Dupri featuring Nate Dogg - "Ballin' Out of Control"
 Christina Milian - "AM to PM"
 Pink - "Get the Party Started" (version 1)
 Nikka Costa - "Everybody Got Their Something"
 No Doubt featuring Bounty Killer - "Hey Baby"
 Missy Elliott featuring Ginuwine and Tweet - "Take Away"
 The Offspring - "Defy You"
 Creed - "My Sacrifice"
 Ja Rule featuring Ashanti - "Always on Time"

2002
 Aaliyah – "More Than a Woman"
 Enrique Iglesias - "Escape"
 Brandy - "What About Us?"
 Mick Jagger - "Visions of Paradise"
 Pink - "Don't Let Me Get Me"
 Lil' Bow Wow - "Take Ya Home"
 Celine Dion - "A New Day Has Come"
 Anastacia - "One Day In Your Life"
 Creed - "One Last Breath"
 B2K - "Gots ta Be"
 Papa Roach - "She Loves Me Not"
 Jennifer Lopez featuring Nas - "I'm Gonna Be Alright"
 Missy Elliott - "4 My People"
 Celine Dion - "I'm Alive"
 Aerosmith - "Girls of Summer"
 Britney Spears featuring Pharrell - "Boys" (The Co-Ed Remix)
 Shakira - "Objection / Te Aviso, Te Anuncio"
 Beenie Man featuring Janet Jackson - "Feel It Boy"
 Trina featuring Tweet - "No Panties"
 Lifehouse - "Spin"
 TLC - "Girl Talk"
 Missy Elliott - "Work It"
 Mariah Carey - "Through the Rain"
 Creed - "Don't Stop Dancing"
 Amerie - "Talkin' to Me"
 Toni Braxton featuring Loon - "Hit the Freeway"
 Birdman featuring Diddy - "Do That"
 Missy Elliott featuring Ludacris - "Gossip Folks"
 Khia featuring Markus Vance - "You My Girl"

2003
 Jennifer Lopez featuring LL Cool J - "All I Have"
 Ginuwine - "Hell Yeah"
 Thalía featuring Fat Joe - "I Want You / Me Pones Sexy"
 Pink - "Feel Good Time"
 Stacie Orrico - "(There's Gotta Be) More to Life"
 JS - "Ice Cream"
 Korn - "Did My Time"
 Westside Connection featuring Nate Dogg - "Gangsta Nation"
 Ludacris - "Stand Up"
 Missy Elliott - "Pass That Dutch"
 Missy Elliott - "Back in the Day" (Unreleased)

2004
 Ludacris - "Splash Waterfalls"
 Dilated Peoples featuring Kanye West and John Legend - "This Way"
 Janet Jackson - "Just a Little While" (version 1)
 Janet Jackson - "I Want You"
 N.E.R.D - "She Wants to Move"
 Hilary Duff - "Come Clean"
 Jay-Z - "Dirt off Your Shoulder"
 Brandy featuring Kanye West - "Talk About Our Love"
 Kelly Clarkson - "Breakaway"
 Britney Spears - "Outrageous" (Unfinished)

2005
 Lil Jon and the East Side Boyz - "Roll Call"
 Dave Matthews Band - "American Baby"
 Missy Elliott featuring Ciara - "Lose Control"/"On & On"
 Dave Matthews Band - "Dreamgirl"
 The Veronicas - "4ever" (Australian version)
 Rhymefest featuring Kanye West - "Brand New"
 Santana featuring Steven Tyler - "Just Feel Better"
 Korn - "Twisted Transistor"

2006
 Pink - "Stupid Girls"
 Missy Elliott - "We Run This"
 Pink - "U + Ur Hand"

2007
 Fergie featuring Ludacris - "Glamorous"
 Natasha Bedingfield - "I Wanna Have Your Babies"
 Korn - "Evolution"
 Pretty Ricky featuring Sean Paul - "Push It Baby"
 Rob Thomas - "Little Wonders"

2008
 Missy Elliott - "Ching-a-Ling/Shake Your Pom Pom"
 Pink - "So What"
 T.I. - "Whatever You Like"

2009
 Pink - "Please Don't Leave Me"
 Lil Wayne - "Prom Queen"
 Rob Thomas - "Her Diamonds"
 Britney Spears - "Radar"
 Pink - "Funhouse"

2010
 Ludacris – "How Low"
 Avril Lavigne – "Alice"
 Leona Lewis – "I Got You"
 Justin Bieber featuring Usher – "Somebody to Love (Remix)"
 Katy Perry – "Firework"
 Pink – "Raise Your Glass"

2011
 Pink – "Fuckin' Perfect"
 David Guetta featuring Flo Rida and Nicki Minaj – "Where Them Girls At"
 Avril Lavigne – "Wish You Were Here"

2012
 Rihanna – "Where Have You Been"
 Pink – "Blow Me (One Last Kiss)"

2015
 Janelle Monáe and Jidenna – "Yoga"
 Ciara – "Dance like We're Making Love"
 Janet Jackson – "No Sleeep"
 Pia Mia – "Touch"
 Missy Elliott featuring Pharrell – "WTF (Where They From)"

2016
 Bebe Rexha featuring Nicki Minaj – "No Broken Hearts"
 Janet Jackson – "Dammn Baby"
 Pink – "Just Like Fire"
 CL – "Lifted"

2017 
 Bebe Rexha – "I Got You"
 Missy Elliott featuring Cainon Lamb – "I'm Better"
 Ariana Grande and John Legend – "Beauty and the Beast"
 WINNER – "Really Really"
 Kendrick Lamar – "HUMBLE."
 SZA – "Drew Barrymore"
 Kendrick Lamar featuring Rihanna – "LOYALTY."
 Katy Perry featuring Nicki Minaj – "Swish Swish"
 Kelly Clarkson – "Love So Soft"
 Camila Cabello featuring Young Thug – "Havana"
 Kendrick Lamar featuring Zacari – "LOVE.

2018 
 Justin Timberlake – "Supplies"
 Zedd, Maren Morris, and Grey – "The Middle"
 Kendrick Lamar and SZA – "All the Stars"
 Maroon 5 – "Wait"
 WINNER – "Everyday"
 Ariana Grande – "No Tears Left to Cry"
 Jay Rock – "WIN"
 Ariana Grande featuring Nicki Minaj – "The Light Is Coming"
 Ariana Grande – "Raindrops (An Angel Cried)"
 Ariana Grande – "God Is a Woman"
 Travis Scott – "Stop Trying to Be God"
 Janet Jackson and Daddy Yankee – "Made for Now"
 Camila Cabello – "Consequences"
 Travis Scott featuring Drake – "Sicko Mode"
 Imagine Dragons – "Zero"
 Cai Xukun – "Wait Wait Wait"

2019 
 Maren Morris – "Girl"
 Billie Eilish – "Bad Guy"
 Taylor Swift featuring Brendon Urie – "Me!" (Directed with Taylor Swift)
 Rich Brian featuring Bekon – "Yellow"
 Ed Sheeran and Travis Scott – "Antisocial"
 Shawn Mendes and Camila Cabello – "Señorita"
 Normani – "Motivation"
 Camila Cabello – "Liar"
 Travis Scott – "Highest in the Room"
 Harry Styles – "Adore You"

2020 
 Camila Cabello featuring DaBaby – "My Oh My"
 Rita Ora – "How to Be Lonely"
 Harry Styles – "Falling"
 Anderson .Paak – "Lockdown"
 Drake featuring Lil Durk – "Laugh Now Cry Later"
 Ariana Grande – "Positions"

2021 
Saweetie featuring Doja Cat – "Best Friend"
Pink – "All I Know So Far (Original & Extended Versions)"
DJ Khaled featuring Post Malone, Megan Thee Stallion, Lil Baby, and DaBaby – "I DID IT"
Coldplay – "Higher Power"
Ed Sheeran – "Bad Habits"
Drake featuring Future and Young Thug – "Way 2 Sexy"
Ed Sheeran – "Shivers"
Coldplay and BTS – "My Universe"

2022 
Coldplay and Selena Gomez – "Let Somebody Go"
Megan Thee Stallion and Dua Lipa – "Sweetest Pie"
Ciara featuring Coast Contra – "Jump"
SZA – "Shirt"

2023
Drake feat. 21 Savage - "Spin Bout U"

References

Myers, Dave